Imen Essrhir better known as Imen Es (born 3 June 1998 in Sevran) is a French singer. In 2020 she released her debut album Nos vies. She has many collaborations and singles most notably "1ère fois' certified diamond.

Career
She was born to Moroccan immigrants to France coming from Meknès, Morocco. She grew up in Sevran and initially was involved in football and boxing. After releasing videos online, she was supported by French rapper Abou Debeing, who became her producer. The two released "Mes défauts" in 2018. She also collaborated with Lartiste and DJ Kayz in "Fonce". Then she launched a solo career with her first major hit in "Attentat". On 14 February 2020, she released her debut album Nos vies with 20 tracks and collaborations with Dadju, Alonzo, Marwa Loud, Abou Debeing, Ju and Franglish. Other releases included collaborations with Kaaris, Da Uzi, DJ Hamida, Benab and many others. Her biggest hit is "1ère fois" with Alonzo that was certified platinum. On 3 December 2021, Imen released her second album entitled ES with 14 tracks and collaborations with Niro, Vitaa, MHD, Camille Lellouche, Abou Debeing and Fedoua Es.

On 8 May 2021, she had her first child, a boy named Djibril.

Discography

Albums

Singles

Featured in

Other charted songs

References

1998 births
Living people
21st-century French women singers
People from Seine-Saint-Denis
French people of Moroccan descent